Wadi as-Salqa ( is a Palestinian agricultural town in the Deir al-Balah Governorate, located south of Deir al-Balah. According to the Palestinian Central Bureau of Statistics (PCBS), the municipality had a population of 6,635 in 2017.

Over half of the inhabitants are below the age of 18. Since the economic sanctions on the Gaza Strip following Hamas' victory in the Palestinian National Authority's legislative elections in 2006, about 85% of Wadi as-Salqa's population lived under the poverty line.

References

Towns in the Gaza Strip
Municipalities of the State of Palestine